The 2012 Baghlia bombing occurred on April 29, 2012 when a bomb detonated against a patrol of the Algerian police in the town of Baghlia, Boumerdès Province, Algeria injuring 7. The Al-Qaeda Organization in the Islamic Maghreb was suspected as being responsible.

See also
 Terrorist bombings in Algeria
 List of terrorist incidents, 2012

References

Boumerdès Province
Suicide car and truck bombings in Algeria
Mass murder in 2012
Terrorist incidents in Algeria
Terrorist incidents in Algeria in 2012
2012 murders in Algeria
Islamic terrorism in Algeria